Adoration of the Magi in a Winter Landscape or Adoration of the Magi in the Snow is a 1563 painting by Pieter Bruegel the Elder, now in the Oskar Reinhart Collection Am Römerholz in Winterthur, Switzerland.

References

 

1567 paintings
Paintings by Pieter Bruegel the Elder
Landscape paintings
Brueghel